"Blue Day" is a song by New Zealand group Mi-Sex, released in February 1984 as the second single from their fourth studio album, Where Do They Go? (1983). The song peaked at number 24 in Australia.

Track listings
Australia/New Zealand 7" (BA 223149)
 "Blue Day" 	
 "Lady Janice"

Australia 12" (BA 12069)
Side A1 "Blue Day"	
Side B1 "Castaway"  (U.S. Version) 
Side B2 "Delinquent Daddy" (Extended Version)

United Kingdom 7" (CBS – A4302)
 "Blue Day"	
 "Don't Look Back in Anger"

Charts

Cover versions
In 1999, New Zealand artist Nicolette recorded an "upbeat dance version" the song, which peaked at number 20 on the New Zealand charts, much to the delight of Mi-Sex's member Colin Bayley, whom Nicolette has been busy writing songs with in Sydney.

In 2014, Australian band FreedomBLUE recorded a version of the song which aired that year on Channel Seven's annual Telethon weekend; a 24-hour annual televised fundraiser for children's hospitals.

References

New Zealand pop rock songs
Mi-Sex songs
1984 singles
1999 singles
1983 songs
CBS Records singles
Song recordings produced by Bob Clearmountain